Qeshlaq-e Qarah Darreh-ye Asam Khan Safar Kandi (also Romanized as Qeshlāq-e Qarah Darreh-ye Āsam Khān Şafar Kandī) is a village in Qeshlaq-e Sharqi Rural District. At the 2006 census, its population was 41, in 9 families.

References 

Populated places in Bileh Savar County
Towns and villages in Bileh Savar County